Close to the Glass is the seventh studio album by German electronic band The Notwist. It was released on 24 February 2014 under City Slang in Europe. It was released on 25 February 2014 under Sub Pop in the United States.

Critical reception

At Metacritic, which assigns a weighted average score out of 100 to reviews from mainstream critics, the album received an average score of 75% based on 23 reviews, indicating "generally favorable reviews".

At Alternative Press, Reed Fischer rated the album three-and-a-half out of five stars, stating that "Close To The Glass resembles ice-skate carvings on a frozen lake: jagged, cold but filled with fractured ambient beauty." Heather Phares of AllMusic rated the album four stars, noting "the way they join the organic and the electronic, the cerebral and the emotional on Close to the Glass makes it the most thoroughly rewarding and enjoyable album of the Notwist's career to date."

Close to the Glass received a nomination for IMPALA's European Independent Album of the Year Award.

Track listing

Charts

References

External links
 

2014 albums
The Notwist albums
City Slang albums
Sub Pop albums